Kish Khaleh (also Romanized as Kīsh Khāleh; also known as Kīsheh Khāleh) is a village in Dinachal Rural District, Pareh Sar District, Rezvanshahr County, Gilan Province, Iran. At the 2006 census, its population was 851, in 206 families.

References 

Populated places in Rezvanshahr County